The Temple for Peace (French: Temple pour la Paix) is a construction project of the congregation Vajradhara-Ling in Normandy to promote world peace. The cornerstone was laid in 2003 and construction started in 2010. This Temple will be built in the same style as the Samye monastery, the first temple built in Tibet that was founded by Padmasambhava in the 8th century CE.

Aims of the Temple 
The aims of the Temple for Peace is not only to share teachings of Tibetan Buddhism but also to welcome demonstrations linked to peace: symposia, inter-religious meetings, expositions and performances. It will be a place to encounter and favor the exchanges between different schools of Buddhism, as well as Christian, Moslem, Jews, and other traditions such as those of Indians of North America and Indigenous Australians.  Meetings will be organized between wise representatives of these traditions, enabling a better knowledge of their diversity as well as common values: their contributions in building a better world, mutual tolerance and the respect of others, in particular through peace and non-violence. Conferences will gather recognized personalities working to promote peace such as Nobel Peace Prize laureates, women and men involved in humanitarian projects, religious dignitaries of different confessions, artists working to promote respect and tolerance between peoples.

Genesis of the project 
In 1995 and in 1998, Lama Gyurme visited Tibet in a pilgrimage and met Orgyen Trinley Dorje, the 17th Karmapa at Tsurphu. He presented him his project for construction of a temple for peace.

The authorization to construct the Temple was granted by the French authorities in March 2002.

The cornerstone was laid by Tenga Rinpoche on September 21, 2003.

The project was consecrated by the 14th Dalai Lama on August 14, 2008, at this occasion, the Dalai Lama delivered a speech on peace.

The construction started in 2010.

Temple architecture 
The Temple will have a surface area of  m2 on five levels.

Peace and Light Festival 
Since 2006, each year at Kagyu-Dzong, the Peace and Light Festival was started to support the construction of the Temple. It includes art exhibition and performances, and takes place in the Pagode de Vincennes. In 2008, it included a concert by Lama Gyurme and Jean-Philippe Rykiel. In 2010, songs by Lama Gyurme were presented by the French actress Véronique Jannot, while Tshering Wangdu also gave a performance.

References

External links 
 Temple pour la Paix
 TEMPLE POUR LA PAIX (3D) (video, LAMAGYURME)

Interfaith dialogue
Tibetan Buddhism in France
Normandy
Buddhist temples in France
Peace and conflict studies
Festivals in France
21st-century Buddhist temples
Buildings and structures completed in 2010
21st-century architecture in France